This article contains a chronological list of notable films which included artificial intelligence either as a protagonist or as an essential part of the film.

Films

See also 
 Artificial intelligence in fiction

References 

Lists of films by topic